John Knowles (1926–2001) was an American novelist.

John Knowles may also refer to:

John Knowles (antitrinitarian) (fl. 1646–1668), English antitrinitarian preacher
John Knowles (author) (1781–1841), arts and naval writer, biographer of Fuseli
John Knowles (Manchester) (1810–1880), English businessman
John Knowles (guitarist) (born 1942), American acoustic guitarist
John Power Knowles (1808–1887), U.S. federal judge
John Cunningham Knowles (1894–1977), politician in Saskatchewan, Canada
John Ward Knowles (1838–1931), stained-glass manufacturer and commentator on art and music
John Evans Knowles (1914–2011), Canadian politician
David Knowles (footballer) (John David Knowles, 1941–2011), English footballer
John Knowles (zoologist), founder of Marwell Wildlife